The 2015 Grand Prix Hassan II was a professional tennis tournament played on clay courts. It was the 31st edition of the tournament and part of the 2015 ATP World Tour. It took place in Casablanca, Morocco between 6 and 12 April 2015.

Singles main-draw entrants

Seeds 

 1 Rankings are as of March 23, 2015.

Other entrants 
The following players received wildcards into the singles main draw:
  Nicolás Almagro
  Yassine Idmbarek
  Lamine Ouahab

The following players received entry from the qualifying draw:
  Aljaž Bedene
  Taro Daniel
  Arthur De Greef
  Paul-Henri Mathieu

Withdrawals 
Before the tournament
  Ivo Karlović →replaced by Máximo González
  Adrian Mannarino →replaced by Tobias Kamke
  João Sousa →replaced by Robin Haase
  Dominic Thiem →replaced by Dustin Brown

Retirements
  Marcel Granollers
  Mikhail Kukushkin

Doubles main-draw entrants

Seeds 

 Rankings are as of March 23, 2015.

Other entrants 
The following pairs received wildcards into the doubles main draw:
  Mehdi Jdi /  Max Mirnyi
  Lamine Ouahab /  Younès Rachidi

Champions

Singles 

  Martin Kližan def.  Daniel Gimeno Traver, 6–2, 6–2

Doubles 

  Rameez Junaid /  Adil Shamasdin def.  Rohan Bopanna /  Florin Mergea, 3–6, 6–2, [10–7]

References

External links 
 

 
Grand Prix Hassan II
Grand Prix Hassan II